30 Rock is an American satirical situation comedy that premiered on NBC on October 11, 2006. Created by Tina Fey, the television series has won and been nominated for a variety of different awards during its seven season run. It received 103 Emmy Awards nominations, with 10 Emmy Award nominations for its first season alone, and a further 17 Emmy Award nominations in its second season. The show won the Primetime Emmy Award for Outstanding Comedy Series for its first three seasons and was nominated every year it was eligible.

Lead actress Tina Fey has been nominated for awards 27 times for her role as Liz Lemon, the head writer of the fictional television show TGS with Tracy Jordan. Fey has also been nominated eight times for her writing skills. Lead actor Alec Baldwin has been nominated 27 times for his portrayal of NBC television executive Jack Donaghy. Through its run, 30 Rock was nominated for 189 different awards, winning 47. A webisode series called Kenneth the Web Page has been nominated for one award. In this list, "year" refers to the year the award was presented to the winner.



Directors Guild of America Awards

Emmy Awards
In its run, 30 Rock was nominated for 103 Emmy Awards, winning 11. In 2007, it won two awards including the Primetime Emmy Award for Outstanding Comedy Series. Also nominated in that category were Entourage, The Office, Two and a Half Men and Ugly Betty. Guest star Elaine Stritch also won an Emmy at that year's awards ceremony for her portrayal of Colleen Donaghy in the season one finale, "Hiatus." In 2008 it won its second award in the category of "Outstanding Comedy Series". In 2009, it won the "Outstanding Comedy Series" for the third time. However, in 2010 and 2011, it failed to win any awards, with  "Modern Family" winning "Outstanding Comedy Series" in those years.

Primetime Emmy Awards

Cast nominations by season

Creative Arts Emmy Awards

GLAAD Media Award

Golden Globe Awards
30 Rock has been nominated for seventeen and won six Golden Globe Awards. The first award was won by Alec Baldwin in 2007, for his role of Jack Donaghy.

Tina Fey won a Golden Globe for her role of Liz Lemon in 2008. Fey chose not to attend the ceremony for her win due to the 2007–2008 Writers Guild of America strike. The Writers Guild of America, of which Fey is a member, did not grant a waiver to the Golden Globes awards ceremony during the strike and did not let its members attend.  Members of the Screen Actors Guild, of which Fey is also a member of, as well as Baldwin, refused to cross Writers Guild picket lines at the ceremony.

In 2009, 30 Rock won all the awards it was nominated for, sweeping the musical or comedy television series awards for both acting and the series as a whole.

NAACP Image Awards

Producers Guild of America Awards

Satellite Awards

Screen Actors Guild Awards

Television Critics Association Awards

Writers Guild of America Awards

Other awards

For the show's 2007 episodes, 30 Rock received a Peabody Award at the 67th Annual Peabody Awards. Upon announcing the award, the Peabody Board commended the show for being "not only a great workplace comedy in the tradition of The Mary Tyler Moore Show, complete with fresh, indelible secondary characters, but also a sly, gleeful satire of corporate media, especially the network that airs it."

References

External links
 Awards for 30 Rock at the Internet Movie Database

30 Rock
Awards